Abrahim Mohamed "Brem" Soumaoro (born 8 August 1996) is a professional footballer who plays as a defender for Canadian club York United. Born in Guinea, he represents Liberia internationally.

Club career
Soumaoro made his Eerste Divisie debut for Jong FC Twente on 29 August 2014 in a game against RKC Waalwijk.

In July 2018, after being released by Go Ahead Eagles, he trialled with 2. Bundesliga side SpVgg Greuther Fürth.

On 10 August 2018, Soumaoro joined Italian Serie B club Livorno. He left the club in 2019, before signing with Jong FC Twente again in early 2020. In August 2020, he moved to FC Den Bosch. He left the club on 1 January 2021, to join MVV Maastricht on a deal for the rest of the season.

On 1 February 2023, Soumaoro joined Canadian Premier League side York United FC, signing a one-year deal, including club options for a further extension.

International career
Born in Guinea, Soumaoro is also eligible to represent Liberia through his parents. In August 2021, he accepted a call up from the Liberian national team for a series of World Cup qualifiers against Nigeria and Central African Republic. He made his debut on 3 September 2021 in a 2–0 away loss to Nigeria, starting and playing the entire match.

References

External links
 
 

1996 births
Living people
People with acquired Liberian citizenship
Liberian footballers
Association football midfielders
FC Twente players
Go Ahead Eagles players
U.S. Livorno 1915 players
FC Den Bosch players
MVV Maastricht players
Eerste Divisie players
Serie B players
Liberia international footballers
Liberian expatriate footballers
Liberian emigrants to the Netherlands
Naturalised citizens of the Netherlands
Liberian expatriate sportspeople in Italy
Expatriate footballers in Italy
Liberian expatriates in Cyprus
Expatriate footballers in Cyprus
People from Nzérékoré
Dutch footballers
Dutch expatriate footballers
Dutch expatriate sportspeople in Italy
Dutch expatriate sportspeople in Cyprus
Dutch people of Liberian descent
Sportspeople of Liberian descent
Jong FC Twente players